Krogulna  is a village in the administrative district of Gmina Pokój, within Namysłów County, Opole Voivodeship, in southern Poland.

The name of the village is of Polish origin and comes from the word krogulec, which means "sparrowhawk".

References

Villages in Namysłów County